Port Clarence Coast Guard Station  is a private-use airport located one nautical mile (2 km) northeast of the central business district of Port Clarence in the Nome Census Area of the U.S. state of Alaska. It is owned by the U.S. Government.

Facilities and aircraft
Port Clarence Coast Guard Station has one runway designated 16/34 with a 4,500 x 120 ft (1,372 x 37 m) asphalt pavement. For the 12-month period ending September 9, 1992, the airport had 200 aircraft operations: 50% air taxi and 50% general aviation.

References

External links
 FAA Alaska airport diagram (GIF)

Airports in the Nome Census Area, Alaska
Military installations in Alaska
United States Coast Guard stations